KPLY (630 AM) is a radio station broadcasting a sports format. Licensed to Reno, Nevada, United States, the station serves the Reno area.  The station is currently owned by Lotus Communications and features programming from Fox Sports Radio.  Its studios are located on Plumb Lane in South Reno, and its transmitter is located in Northeast Reno.

History
The station went on the air as KOH on 1928-09-13, and is the oldest radio station in Nevada. It was the last "new station" in the United States to receive a three-letter callsign. KOH retained this call until 1994-03-10 (1994-03-18, by FCC records).  In 1994, as part of a complex realignment of stations in the Reno area, the KOH intellectual unit moved to 780 AM under the calls KKOH, while 630 AM changed its calls to KRCV.  On 1995-12-08, the station changed its call sign to KNRC, on 1996-02-19 to KHIT. On 1998-11-17 the station changed to KPTT, on 2005-03-16 to the current KPLY.

KPLY is the Reno radio partner for the San Francisco 49ers.

References

External links

FCC History Cards for KPLY

Radio stations established in 1928
PLY
Lotus Communications stations